Eastleigh L.F.C. is an English women's football club affiliated with Eastleigh Football Club based in Eastleigh, Hampshire. They currently compete in the Southern Region Women's Football League First Southern, following back-to-back promotions from the Hampshire County Women's Football League Division One, and the Southern Region Women's Football League Division 1.

History
Originally formed in 2007, Eastleigh Ladies joined the Hampshire County Women's Football League in its third season. For the 2007–08 season, the club was admitted into Division Two of the Hampshire County Women's League, and won promotion to the Hampshire County Women's League Division One after finishing as champions ahead of 2nd-placed Rushmoor Community in its inaugural season. The following two seasons saw the Spitfires finish in a respectable 4th place in Division One. At the end of the 2010–11 season, Eastleigh were crowned champions for the second time since the clubs' inception back in 2007, beating QK Southampton Ladies to the Division title with only three points separating both teams. However the next season brought about the end of the women's side due to a lack of facilities which saw the team disband.

Re-founding 
The team was re-founded in 2016 and won both the Hampshire County Women's Football League Division One championship, and the Southern Region Women's Football League Division 1 championship in its first two seasons. The spitfires season's following 19/20 and 20/21 were curtailed due to COVID-19. However, with manager Ashley Healey and Assistant manager Brad Walsh they led the club to its first Cup final and one of its most successful seasons to date.

Squad

Honours

Regional
 Hampshire County Women's Football League Division Two:
 Winners (1): 2007–08
 Hampshire County Women's Football League Division One:
Winners (1): 2010–11
Runners-up (1): 2016–17
Hampshire County Women's Football League Cup
Runners-up (1): 2016–17

References

External links
Eastleigh Ladies F.C.  at Eastleigh F.C.
Unofficial fanzine of Eastleigh Ladies F.C. at TSSC

Women's football clubs in England
Football clubs in Hampshire
Association football clubs established in 2007
Eastleigh F.C.
2007 establishments in England
Association football clubs disestablished in 2012
2012 disestablishments in England
Association football clubs established in 2016
2016 establishments in England